Michel Van Wijnendaele was a Belgian mass murderer who killed seven people in Bogaarden, Belgium on May 12, 1987. He also wounded three others, before committing suicide.

Shooting
At approximately 2:00 p.m., Van Wijnendaele, armed with a .22-caliber rifle, entered a farm in Bogaarden, where he shot dead Jean Baptiste and Margriet Nechelput, their daughter, Liliane De Crem, her husband, Edgard, as well as their son, Christian, and also wounded another son of the De Crem's with a shot in the stomach after a short scuffle. At a neighbouring farm he killed a woman and her son, apparently because they had witnessed the shooting, and then fled the scene in his car. While police set up roadblocks to capture the gunman, he made his way to Denderwindeke, where he shot and wounded his parents-in-law three or four hours later.

Van Wijnendaele was eventually spotted by police in Brugelette, as he was filling his car at a gas station. A car chase ensued that ended at about 7:00 p.m. when the 28-year-old was cornered by police in Sirault, near Mons, whereupon he committed suicide by shooting himself in the head.

Victims
Jean Baptiste Nechelput, 90
Margriet Nechelput, 84, wife of Jean Baptiste Nechelput
Liliane De Crem, 46, daughter of Jean Baptiste and Margriet Nechelput
Edgard De Crem, 54, husband of Liliane De Crem
Christian De Crem, 20, son of Liliane and Edgar De Crem
Marie-Thérèse Walraevens, 37
Ludovic Derycke, 3, son of Marie-Thérèse Walraevens

References

20th-century Belgian criminals
1950s births
1987 deaths
Belgian mass murderers
Belgian murderers of children
Family murders
Suicides by firearm in Belgium
1987 in Belgium
Belgian spree killers
1987 mass shootings in Europe
Mass shootings in Belgium